MV Viking Sun is a cruise ship operated by Viking Ocean Cruises.  The fourth in a series of 930-passenger cruise ships to be built by Fincantieri for her operator, she was delivered at Fincantieri's shipyard in Ancona, Italy, on 25 September 2017.

In April 2021, ownership the Viking Sun was transferred to Viking Sun Ltd. of Bermuda, for operation by China Merchants Viking Cruises, a joint venture of Viking Ocean Cruises and China Merchants Shekou Cruises. She was then transferred to Chinese registration, with port of registry Qianhai, Shenzhen, and renamed Zhao Shang Yi Dun.

References

External links 

 

Ships built in Ancona
Ships built by Fincantieri
Cruise ships
2017 ships